Bird City is a city in Cheyenne County, Kansas, United States.  As of the 2020 census, the population of the city was 437.

History
Bird City was founded in 1885. It was named for Benjamin Bird, a cattleman. The surrounding area was originally used predominately for livestock grazing.

Bird City was a station and shipping point on the Chicago, Burlington and Quincy Railroad.

Geography
Bird City is located at  (39.750950, -101.533480).

Climate
According to the Köppen Climate Classification system, Bird City has a semi-arid climate, abbreviated "BSk" on climate maps.

Demographics

2010 census
As of the census of 2010, there were 447 people, 211 households, and 118 families residing in the city. The racial makeup of the city was 96.2% White, 0.4% Native American, 0.9% from other races, and 2.5% from two or more races. Hispanic or Latino of any race were 15.0% of the population.

There were 211 households, of which 24.2% had children under the age of 18 living with them, 48.3% were married couples living together, 7.1% had a female householder with no husband present, 0.5% had a male householder with no wife present, and 44.1% were non-families. 40.8% of all households were made up of individuals, and 24.6% had someone living alone who was 65 years of age or older. The average household size was 2.12 and the average family size was 2.91.

The median age in the city was 47.4 years. 24.2% of residents were under the age of 18; 4% were between the ages of 18 and 24; 19.9% were from 25 to 44; 26.1% were from 45 to 64; and 25.7% were 65 years of age or older. The gender makeup of the city was 48.5% male and 51.5% female.

2000 census
As of the census of 2000, there were 482 people, 232 households, and 128 families residing in the city. The racial makeup of the city was 99.17% White, 0.21% Native American, 0.21% from other races, and 0.41% from two or more races. Hispanic or Latino of any race were 2.90% of the population.

There were 232 households, out of which 22.8% had children under the age of 18 living with them, 49.1% were married couples living together, 4.3% had a female householder with no husband present, and 44.4% were non-families. 43.1% of all households were made up of individuals, and 28.4% had someone living alone who was 65 years of age or older. The average household size was 2.08 and the average family size was 2.88.

In the city, the population was spread out, with 23.9% under the age of 18, 3.7% from 18 to 24, 19.7% from 25 to 44, 19.1% from 45 to 64, and 33.6% who were 65 years of age or older. The median age was 48 years. For every 100 females, there were 87.5 males. For every 100 females age 18 and over, there were 79.0 males.

The median income for a household in the city was $25,714, and the median income for a family was $32,589. Males had a median income of $24,531 versus $17,500 for females. The per capita income for the city was $16,680. About 15.0% of families and 17.7% of the population were below the poverty line, including 25.9% of those under age 18 and 9.2% of those age 65 or over.

Education
Bird City  is served by Cheylin USD 103. School unification consolidated Bird City and McDonald schools in 1975 creating USD 103. The Cheylin High School mascot is Cheylin Cougars.

Bird City High School was closed through school unification. The Bird City High School mascot was Cardinals.

References

Further reading

External links

 City of Bird City
 Bird City - Directory of Public Officials
 Cheylin USD 103, local school district
 Bird City Map, KDOT

Cities in Kansas
Cities in Cheyenne County, Kansas
1885 establishments in Kansas
Populated places established in 1885